The black sea bass (Centropristis striata) is a species of marine ray-finned fish, a sea bass from the subfamily Serraninae which is part of the family Serranidae, which also includes the groupers and anthias. It is found in the western Atlantic Ocean, where it is an important species for commercial and recreational fisheries.

Description
The black sea bass has an oblong, laterally compressed body. It has a large mouth, armed with bands of teeth on the jaw and with a triangular patch of teeth in the front part roof of the mouth and more teeth along the sides of that area, the mouth extending as far as below the middle of the eye. The preopercle has fine serrations on its margin and is evenly rounded, while the gill cover bears three flat spines. The dorsal fin has ten spines, the front spines being longer than the rearmost, and 11 soft rays. The membranes between the spines of the dorsal fin are deeply notched. The anal fin has three spines and seven soft rays. The caudal fin has three lobes created by the long and pointed upper, middle and lower rays. The colour pattern is normally smoky grey, dusky brown or blue-black on the back and upper body, fading towards the underside. In the middle of each scale there is a pale blue to white spot and these form longitudinal stripes along the back and flanks. The dorsal fin has a series of white spots and bands along its length. The flanks can frequently appear mottled or have dark and light vertical barring. In the breeding season the males develop bright fluorescent blue and green around the eyes and nape and a hump on the head contrasting with the paler and duller females which are brownish or blue-grey in colour. The juveniles are found in four colour phases; the first is an overall light grey phase which has small dark spots, there is a dark phase which has pale white spots, a striped phase with a longitudinal dark stripe and a barred phase which has six vertical bars.

Distribution
The black sea bass is found in the western Atlantic Ocean from Nova Scotia south along the eastern coast of North America as far as the Florida Keys and into the Gulf of Mexico as far as Louisiana where the western limit is just to the west of the Mississippi Delta.

Habitat and biology
They spend most of their time near the bottom where they frequently aggregate around features on the bottom such as piles of rocks, wrecks and man-made structures. It is often encountered resting in either a head-down or head-up position. Normally the dorsal fin is folded down but will be raised and spread out as an aggressive signal to other members of its own species. The juveniles remain in the protected estuarine waters where they are found around man-made structures, wrecks and over shell substrates. This species is a slow growing fish and they reach sexual maturity at between one and three years old. They are protogynous hermaphrodites, the majority of them begin life as females and then change to males. The stimulus for the change is not known but it is thought that the largest females change sex in response to a shortage of males within a spawning group. These fishes spawn from January to July with the smaller females producing as few as 30,000 eggs while the larger females can produce 500,000 eggs. Their eggs are pelagic and have a diameter of 0.9-1.0mm. They are a predatory species with a rather catholic diet which includes crabs, shrimps, barnacles, worms, tunicates, small fish and bivalves. They are also preyed on by larger fish and their known predators include monkfish (Lophius americanus), spotted hake (Urophycis regia), summer flounder (Paralichthys dentatus), striped bass (Morone saxatilis), bluefish (Pomatomus saltatrix), weakfish (Cynoscion regalis), little skate (Leucoraja erinacea), spiny dogfish (Squalus acanthias), bignose shark (Carcharhinus altimus) and dusky shark (Carcharhinus obscurus). Females live to around 8 years of age while males can live to 12 years old.

Taxonomy
The black sea bass was first formally described as Labrus striatus by Carolus Linnaeus in the tenth edition of his Systema Naturae published in 1758, Linnaeus gave the type locality as America. When the French anatomist and zoologist Georges Cuvier created the genus Centropristis he used Bloch and Schneider's 1801 Coryphaenus nigrescens as the type species for the new genus, this is a synonym of Linnaeus's Labrus striatus so the black sea bass is the type species of the genus Centropristis. The generic name is a compound of the Greek words kentron meaning "a saw" and pristis which means "sting".

Utilisation
Black sea bass are highly sought after by recreational and commercial fisherman, There are two populations identified for fisheries management. NOAA Fisheries, the Mid-Atlantic Fishery Management Council, and the Atlantic States Marine Fisheries Commission cooperate in the management of the black sea bass fishery in the seas north of Cape Hatteras in North Carolina while NOAA Fisheries and the  South Atlantic Fishery Management Council manage the fishery south of Cape Hatteras. Management includes catch limits, permits and a close season. This species has lean, white flesh which has a relatively firm texture, breaks into small flakes and has a delicate flavour. These small size of most of the fish available means that they are often cooked whole. Thare are caught using otter trawls, hook and line and in pots or traps. They have shown some promise in aquaculture but have not been farmed commercially yet.. In sheltered environments the black sea bass can attain a high growth rate but this does not lead to long-term survival of their populations.

References

 
 McClane, A. J. (1978). McClane's Field Guide to Saltwater Fishes of North America.

External links
 Black Sea Bass – South Carolina Department of Natural Resources
 Black Sea Bass – North Carolina Division of Marine Fisheries
 Black Sea Bass – South Atlantic Fishery Management Council
 Black Sea Bass – Chefs of Carolina
 Black Sea Bass – Chefs Resources
 Black Sea Bass – Food Choice
 

black sea bass
Commercial fish
Fauna of the Southeastern United States
Fish of the Eastern United States
black sea bass
black sea bass